William Rust Summit or Willhelm Rust Summit is a summit in Contra Costa County, California in the Berkeley Hills above the city of El Cerrito.  It was named in honor of William Rust (1857–1940), a pioneer settler who was active in business & community affairs.

See also
 List of summits of the San Francisco Bay Area

Notes

Berkeley Hills
Mountains of the San Francisco Bay Area
Mountains of Contra Costa County, California
El Cerrito, California
Geography of Richmond, California
Mountains of Northern California